Elnaeim Mohamed Osman Elnour is a Sudanese footballer who plays for Al-Ahli Shendi in the Sudan Premier League. He plays as winger. He was a member of the Sudan national team at the 2011 Pan Arab Games.

References

Sudanese footballers
Living people
Al-Ahly Shendi players
Place of birth missing (living people)
Association football wingers
Sudan international footballers
1990 births